Two Songs is a pair of songs for voice and piano composed in 1916 by John Ireland (18791962).

A performance of both songs takes around 3 minutes. Both are settings of poems by Eric Thirkell Cooper from Soliloquies of a Subaltern Somewhere in France (1915).

 "Blind"
 "The Cost"

References 

Song cycles by John Ireland
1916 compositions
Musical settings of poems by Eric Thirkell Cooper
Songs based on poems